The Catholic Clerical Union is an American Anglo-Catholic organization founded in 1886 as the Clerical Union for the Maintenance and Defence of Catholic Principles.

In 2006, its website listed chapters for Albany, Chicago, Dallas-Fort Worth, New England, New York-New Jersey-Connecticut, and Northern Indiana.

An organization with the name Catholic Clerical Union was incorporated in California as a domestic non-profit on October 12, 2017 (number C4073892).

Bibliography
Harry St Clair Hathaway, Bishops Suffragan (1909)
The Anglo-Catholic (Periodical published at Milwaukee beginning in 1975)

Notable members
Donald L. Garfield
Frank Gavin
Edward Rochie Hardy, Jr.
Henry Harrison Oberly
Arthur Ritchie
Robert Ritchie
Granville Mercer Williams SSJE

See also
Society of the Holy Cross
Society of Catholic Priests

External links
Archived official website
Edward Rochie Hardy, Jr., Fifty Years of the Clerical Union (1937)
A Sermon Preached before the Vice-President and Council of the Clerical Union for the Maintenance and Defense of Catholic Principles, and the Catholic Club of Philadelphia in Memory of the Reverend Henry Robert Percival, D.D. in St. Mark's Church, Philadelphia, November 10th, 1903 (1903) from Philadelphia Studies
Program for the Philadelphia Branch of the Catholic Clerical Union for 1969-1970 from Philadelphia Studies
Anglican organizations established in the 19th century
Anglo-Catholicism
Religious organizations established in 1886